Omar Enrique Vizquel González (born April 24, 1967), nicknamed "Little O", is a Venezuelan former professional baseball shortstop. During his 24-year Major League Baseball (MLB) career, Vizquel played for the Seattle Mariners, Cleveland Indians, San Francisco Giants, Texas Rangers, Chicago White Sox, and Toronto Blue Jays. In Venezuela he played for Leones del Caracas. From 2014 to 2017, he was the Detroit Tigers' first-base, infield and baserunning coach. He was manager for the Toros de Tijuana of the Mexican League.

Widely considered one of baseball's all-time best fielding shortstops, Vizquel won 11 Gold Glove Awards, including nine consecutive from 1993 to 2001. Among shortstops, his .985 fielding percentage is tied for highest all-time, he is the all-time leader in games played, and the all-time leader in double plays turned. Vizquel tied Cal Ripken Jr.'s American League record for most consecutive games at shortstop without an error (95, between September 26, 1999, and July 21, 2000), since surpassed. Vizquel ranked as the all-time hits leader among players from Venezuela (2,877; 44th all-time) until May 12, 2021, when he was surpassed by Miguel Cabrera. Vizquel has third-most hits all time among shortstops, behind Derek Jeter and Honus Wagner. Vizquel is also the career sacrifice hits leader of the live-ball era.

At the time of his retirement, Vizquel was the oldest position player in the Major Leagues, and the only active position player with service time in the 1980s. He is one of only 31 players in baseball history to play in Major League games in four decades, and the only one who played shortstop. On May 7, 2012, Vizquel became the oldest player to play at shortstop in Major League history, surpassing Bobby Wallace, who played 12 games with the St. Louis Cardinals at the age of 44 in 1918.

Vizquel was the last active player in any of the major North American professional sports leagues to have played in the 1980s. Starting in 2020, various allegations of domestic abuse and sexual assault emerged against him.

Professional career

Seattle Mariners
Vizquel started his career with the Leones del Caracas of the Venezuelan Winter League together with Tony Armas, Bo Díaz and Andrés Galarraga. He learned to switch hit from Bill Plummer who managed Vizquel with the Leones del Caracas, in 1986–87 and 1988–89, and coached and managed the Mariners. Originally signed by the Mariners as a non-drafted free agent in 1984, Vizquel made his Major League debut on April 3, 1989. Batting ninth in the lineup, he went 0-for-3 while making five assists, a double play and an error in a 3–2 loss to the Oakland Athletics. Three nights later, he collected his first career hit in the third inning against Storm Davis with a single, later scoring on a Darnell Coles double, although the Mariners lost 11–3 to the Athletics.

Cleveland Indians
At the end of the 1993 season, Vizquel was traded by the Mariners to the Indians for Félix Fermín, Reggie Jefferson, and cash. During Vizquel's career in Cleveland, the Indians made it to the World Series twice, losing to the Atlanta Braves in 1995 and to the Florida Marlins in 1997. Vizquel is a lifetime .250 hitter in 57 postseason games.

Vizquel won nine consecutive Gold Gloves with the Mariners and Indians, starting with his first in 1993 with Seattle and continuing until 2001. Alex Rodriguez broke Vizquel's streak and won the award in 2002. Vizquel won two additional Gold Gloves in 2005 and 2006 with the San Francisco Giants.

In 1999, Vizquel hit over .300 and scored 100 runs for the first time in his career, finishing the season with a .333 batting average and 112 runs scored for an Indians team that scored a league-leading 1,009 runs. Vizquel hit second in the line-up between lead-off man Kenny Lofton and third-place hitter Roberto Alomar in the most productive offensive line-up in Cleveland baseball history. This line-up also included power hitters Jim Thome and Manny Ramirez.

On August 5, 2001, Vizquel hit a three-run triple in the ninth inning against the Seattle Mariners to tie the game 14–14, capping a comeback from a 14–2 deficit. The Indians went on to win 15–14 in 11 innings, tying the record for the largest comeback win in history. Vizquel reached career highs in 2002 hitting 14 homers and 72 RBI, but his success was interrupted by the need for surgery on his right knee. He tied the 2002 All-Star Game 7–7 with an RBI triple in the eighth inning. As a result of his knee injury in 2002 and a follow-up operation, he appeared in only 64 games in 2003. In a game on May 27, 2003, Vizquel had a straight steal of home against the Detroit Tigers. He caught Tigers pitcher Steve Avery by surprise and made it home without a throw. Vizquel returned in 2004 to hit .291 in 148 games. At the end of the season, Vizquel was signed by the Giants as a free agent.

San Francisco Giants
 On June 23, 2007, the Hispanic Heritage Baseball Museum Hall of Fame inducted Vizquel, along with former Giants outfielder Matty Alou, into its Hall of Fame during an on-field, pre-game ceremony. For the 13th and final time, Vizquel finished in the top ten in sacrifice hits, having 14 to finish 2nd along with John Maine behind Juan Pierre.

Vizquel underwent arthroscopic knee surgery on February 27, 2008. He started the 2008 season on the disabled list and played in his first game on May 10. Vizquel stole home for the second time in his career against Oakland Athletics pitcher Greg Smith on June 13.

Vizquel won the Hutch Award and the Willie Mac Award, and was a finalist for the Heart & Hustle Award. Only two other players, Dave Dravecky and Craig Biggio, have won more than one of these awards, although Willie McCovey himself won the Hutch Award before having the Willie Mac Award named for him.

Vizquel was Greg Maddux's 3,000th strikeout victim on July 26, 2005.

Texas Rangers
On January 21, 2009, Vizquel signed a minor league contract with the Texas Rangers and made the team's major league roster. He served mainly as a backup middle infielder. In 62 games with the Rangers, he had 47 hits, 17 runs, 14 RBIs with a .266 batting average and a .660 OPS to go with 27 strikeouts and 13 walks. In each of the three positions (shortstop, third base, second base) he played with the team, he made no errors. He played 27 games at shortstop for 196.2 innings, making 32 putouts and 76 assists with 22 double plays turned; he appeared in 20 games at third base for 101 innings, having five putouts and 22 assists, while making 23 putouts and 49 assists at second base.

Chicago White Sox
On November 23, 2009, Vizquel agreed to a one-year contract with the Chicago White Sox worth $1.4 million. After making the deal official, former shortstop and White Sox legend (and fellow Venezuelan) Luis Aparicio asked that his number 11 be temporarily "unretired" for Vizquel during the 2010 season, mostly due to the fact that White Sox manager Ozzie Guillén — like Vizquel and Aparicio, a Venezuelan shortstop — had rights to #13, the number Vizquel has worn through his career.

On May 25, 2010, Vizquel became the shortstop with the third most hits all time, behind Derek Jeter and Honus Wagner. On June 25, he hit his first home run of 2010, putting him on the short list of players who have hit home runs in four different decades (with Ted Williams, Willie McCovey, and Rickey Henderson). On November 2, 2010, Vizquel signed a one-year deal to remain in Chicago. On April 3, 2011, Vizquel hit a single for his 2,800th career hit. Despite being well into his forties, Vizquel was still regarded as one of the better defensive shortstops in the game and seen by his former White Sox teammates as one of the most physically fit.

Toronto Blue Jays
Vizquel signed a one-year minor league contract with the Toronto Blue Jays for the 2012 season. He made the team out of spring training, and made his first appearance on Opening Day, against his former club, the Cleveland Indians. His first start came on April 22, against the Kansas City Royals. Vizquel was ejected from a game against the Texas Rangers on May 1, arguing with the home plate umpire from the bench. Vizquel jokingly danced to mock the umpire before exiting the dugout. Vizquel hinted at retirement upon the conclusion of the 2012 season. Despite being 45 years of age and appearing in only five games at that point in the season with the Blue Jays, he stated, "I feel excited about coming to the ballpark. Maybe not every day, because there are going to be some days you're going to be sore. But I still feel I want to be here. I want to compete."

In a game against the Detroit Tigers on July 27, Vizquel hit his first two extra-base hits of the season, a double and triple. Vizquel became the third oldest player to hit a triple (behind Julio Franco and Nick Altrock) and became the oldest player in major league history to hit a double and a triple in the same game.

In the first game of a day-night doubleheader against the New York Yankees on September 19, Vizquel recorded his 2,874th career hit, passing Babe Ruth for 41st all-time.

In the final game of the 2012 season, Brett Lawrie wore a #17 jersey as opposed to his usual #13. This allowed Vizquel to wear #13 (the number he wore through most of his career) when he played his final game on October 3, 2012. Vizquel went 1-for-3, hitting a single in his last at-bat, the 2,877th hit of his career, moving him ahead of Mel Ott for 40th position on the all-time hits list. Vizquel retired after the season and was the last position player born in the 1960s, as well as the last to play in the 1980s, to retire.

Coaching

Los Angeles Angels of Anaheim
On January 30, 2013, Vizquel was hired by the Los Angeles Angels of Anaheim to become a co-infield coach with Bobby Knoop, to replace Dick Schofield, whose contract was not renewed for 2013.

Detroit Tigers

On November 18, 2013, the Detroit Tigers named Vizquel as their new first-base coach, replacing Rafael Belliard. Under manager Brad Ausmus, Vizquel also served as the Tigers infield and baserunning instructor. Following the dismissal of Ausmus after the 2017 season, Vizquel interviewed for the vacant manager's position, but was passed over in favor of Ron Gardenhire.

Chicago White Sox
In November 2017 Vizquel returned to the White Sox organization to manage their Class A-Advanced team, the Winston-Salem Dash. In December 2018 Vizquel was promoted to manage the White Sox' Class AA team, the Birmingham Barons. In 2019 Vizquel was let go by the Barons after an incident between him and a male employee which resulted in an MLB investigation.

Toros de Tijuana
On December 2, 2019, Vizquel was named as the new manager for the Toros de Tijuana of the Mexican League. In July 2021, Vizquel left the team.

Personal life

Vizquel is active in community service, having served as an honorary spokesperson for "Young Audiences", an arts education organization in Cleveland, and "Schools Now", which raises funds through the sale of entertainment booklets. Following the 1999 Vargas mudslide disaster that killed 25,000 in his native Venezuela, Vizquel volunteered for the relief effort and helped raise over $500,000 for the cause. Vizquel has held various charitable events in downtown Cleveland such as Tribe Jam, where he and some other teammates get together with each other or with retired singers and sing some of their favorite songs.

His 2002 autobiography, Omar!: My Life on and Off the Field, which he co-wrote with Bob Dyer, spent four weeks on the New York Times Best Seller List. It was released in paperback in 2003.

Vizquel married Nicole Tonkin, a Seattle native, in 1992. They later divorced, and Vizquel married Blanca Garcia in July 2014.

Feud with José Mesa
A long-running and well-publicized feud erupted between Vizquel and former teammate and friend José Mesa. In 2002, following the publication of his autobiography, Omar! My Life On and Off the Field, Vizquel criticized Mesa's performance in Game 7 of the 1997 World Series: "The eyes of the world were focused on every move we made. Unfortunately, Jose's own eyes were vacant. Completely empty. Nobody home. You could almost see right through him. Not long after I looked into his vacant eyes, he blew the save and the Marlins tied the game." Mesa reacted furiously, pledging to hit Vizquel upon every subsequent opportunity: "Even my little boy told me to get him. If I face him 10 more times, I'll hit him 10 times. I want to kill him."

On June 12, 2002, Mesa hit Vizquel with a pitch in the ninth inning. Mesa was not ejected and finished the game. They did not face each other again until 2006; by then, Vizquel was with the San Francisco Giants and Mesa was playing for the Colorado Rockies. When Vizquel came to bat against Mesa in Denver on April 22, Mesa hit him again. Meeting three more times in 2006, however, Vizquel escaped being hit by his former teammate, with two groundouts and an RBI single. Vizquel batted .333 (7-for-21) against Mesa before Mesa's retirement in 2007.

Domestic abuse allegations 
On December 16, 2020, The Athletic reported that Vizquel's wife Blanca (who was filing for divorce) alleged that he physically abused her in 2011 (which was before their marriage) and in 2016. Blanca previously made the allegation in an Instagram live video on October 7, 2020. According to The Athletic, in 2016, Vizquel was charged with fourth-degree domestic assault after an incident at their Seattle-area home in Sammamish, Washington. Blanca told police that her husband pushed her during an argument, causing her to fall and suffer an injury to her shin and multiple broken fingernails. Charges were later dropped at her request. She claimed in the article that Vizquel coerced her into signing the letter and threatened her with financial retribution. The Athletic also mentioned an incident in December 2011, when Vizquel allegedly strangled his wife during an argument at her sister's home in Alabama. He denied the allegation and claimed that Blanca scratched him, which she denies. The couple ultimately filed a successful joint motion to dismiss charges.

In a statement, Vizquel strongly denied the allegations against him. MLB is currently investigating the situation.

Sexual harassment lawsuit

The Athletic reported on August 7, 2021, that Vizquel has been named in a civil action alleging sexual harassment of a batboy with autism for the Birmingham Barons, the AA Minor League Baseball affiliate of the Chicago White Sox. According to the report, the batboy claimed in his complaint that Vizquel targeted him because of a disability the batboy suffers. The Athletic further reports that the lawsuit was filed in federal district court in Alabama and that it is based on the Americans with Disabilities Act.

Records and accomplishments

Fielding
All-time leader in double plays made while playing shortstop
11-time Gold Glove recipient
Oldest shortstop recipient of the Gold Glove (age 38 in 2005, and again at age 39 in 2006)
Highest career fielding percentage by a shortstop (0.9846) with at least 1,000 games played
Lowest number of errors in a season by a shortstop (tie) (3 in the 2000 season)
Sixth in assists all-time, third in assists at SS all-time

Offense
At retirement was the all-time leader in hits by a player from Venezuela
The 47th major league player to reach 2,800 career hits (April 3, 2011)
At retirement was the second-most hits by an active (roster) player behind Derek Jeter, was the category leader for the 2008 and a portion of the 2009 seasons, 47th all-time
At retirement had the most singles by an active (roster) player, 20th all-time
At retirement had the most at-bats by an active (roster) player, 19th all-time
Fifth all-time in sacrifice hits plus sacrifice flies behind Eddie Collins, Jake Daubert, Stuffy McInnis and Willie Keeler
All-time leader in sacrifice hits in the live-ball era, and four-time league leader (1997, 1999, 2004 & 2005)
Likely fifth to seventh all-time in sacrifice hits after accounting for the 1954 statistical change (40th all-time without adjustment)
At retirement, had the second-most sacrifice flies by an active (roster) player behind Alex Rodriguez, 50th all-time (tie)
At retirement had the third most stolen bases by an active (roster) player behind Juan Pierre and Carl Crawford, 68th all-time
American League record holder (tie) for most hits in a nine-inning game: Vizquel hit six on August 31, 2004
Second-most hits while playing shortstop (behind Derek Jeter)
Fourth-most runs while playing shortstop all-time (behind Herman Long, Derek Jeter and Bill Dahlen)
Seventh-most stolen bases while playing shortstop all-time (behind Bert Campaneris, Ozzie Smith, Herman Long, Luis Aparicio, Honus Wagner, and Bill Dahlen)
At retirement had most seasons by active player as a batting title qualifier with isolated power (extra bases per at-bat) under .100, with 12
44th all-time in career hits (2,877)

Overall
First all time in games played at shortstop
At retirement had played the most games by an active (roster) player, 14th all-time
Three-time All-Star (1998, 1999 & 2002)
Won two American League Championships (with Cleveland, 1995, 1997)
Won six American League Central Division Championships (with Cleveland, 1995–99, 2001)
Won the Hutch Award (1996), the only non-American player ever to do so
Won the Willie Mac Award (2006) for spirit and leadership
Finalist for the Heart & Hustle Award (2007) for embodying "the values, spirit and tradition of the game"
Captain of Venezuelan World Baseball Classic team (2006)
Member of the Hispanic Heritage Baseball Museum Hall of Fame
Inducted into the Cleveland Indians Hall of Fame (2014)
Selected as one of the four greatest Indians in franchise history for the 2015 All Star Game's "Franchise 4"(2015)

Vizquel has appeared on balloting for the National Baseball Hall of Fame since 2018, when he received 37.0% of the vote, well short of the 75% required for election, but well above the 5% minimum required to remain on the ballot. His support increased to 52.6% in 2020 before going down to 49.1% in the 2021 ballot and then cratering to 23.9% in the 2022 ballot, his fifth year on the ballot. A player may appear on the ballot a maximum of ten times.

See also

 Cleveland Indians award winners and league leaders
 List of Gold Glove middle infield duos
 List of Major League Baseball career assists leaders
 List of Major League Baseball career doubles leaders
 List of Major League Baseball career games played leaders
 List of Major League Baseball career hits leaders
 List of Major League Baseball career runs scored leaders
 List of Major League Baseball career singles leaders
 List of Major League Baseball career stolen bases leaders
 List of Major League Baseball players from Venezuela
 List of Major League Baseball players who played in four decades
 List of Major League Baseball single-game hits leaders
 Seattle Mariners award winners and league leaders

Notes

Sources
"Vizquel an artist at work" by Jeff Passan, Yahoo! Sports, May 24, 2006.
"Older players make final bids for Hall of Fame" by Mel Antonen, USA TODAY, July 27, 2006.
"Last call for the Hall" by Gary Kaufman, Salon.com, July 26, 2000.
"ALL SYSTEMS O!" by Bill Livingston, The Plain Dealer, September 26, 2004.
Omar Vizquel and Bob Dyer (2002). Omar!: My Life on and Off the Field. Gray & Company Publishers. .
Hits/runs/games-while-playing-shortstop calculated using statistics at BaseballReference.com.

References

External links

Reaches 2500 hits
Guitar Mania — Vizquel's painted guitar photos
Article mentioning MLB record of the fewest errors by a shortstop in a season
A sample chapter from the book Omar! by Omar Vizquel and Bob Dyer

1967 births
Living people
American League All-Stars
Bellingham Mariners players
Butte Copper Kings players
Calgary Cannons players
Charlotte Knights players
Chicago White Sox players
Cleveland Indians players
Detroit Tigers coaches
Fresno Grizzlies players
Gold Glove Award winners
Lake County Captains players
Leones del Caracas players
Major League Baseball first base coaches
Major League Baseball players from Venezuela
Major League Baseball shortstops
Baseball players from Caracas
Salinas Spurs players
San Bernardino Spirit players
San Francisco Giants players
San Jose Giants players
Seattle Mariners players
Texas Rangers players
Toronto Blue Jays players
Venezuela national baseball team managers
Venezuelan baseball coaches
Venezuelan expatriate baseball players in Canada
Venezuelan expatriate baseball players in the United States
Vermont Mariners players
Wausau Timbers players
World Baseball Classic managers
World Baseball Classic players of Venezuela
2006 World Baseball Classic players
People charged with assault